WWBK-LD, virtual channel 28 (UHF digital channel 25), is a low-powered television station licensed to Richmond, Virginia, United States. The station is owned by HC2 Holdings.

History 
The station’s construction permit was initially a digital companion channel issued on October 2, 2012 under the calls of W28EN-D. It was changed to the current WWBK-LD calls were assigned on June 4, 2014.

Digital channels
The station's digital signal is multiplexed:

References

External links
DTV America

Low-power television stations in the United States
Innovate Corp.
WBK-LD
Television channels and stations established in 2012
2012 establishments in Virginia